Khudadat bey Agha bey oghlu Malik-Aslanov (April 1879 – 23 July 1935) was an Azerbaijani engineer, politician and university professor.

Early life
Malik-Aslanov was born to a wealthy noble family in a village of Taynaq in Shusha Uyezd of the Elisabethpol Governorate of the Russian Empire (now in Azerbaijan's Aghjabadi District). After graduation from the Shusha Realschule in 1899, he was sponsored by philanthropist Zeynalabdin Taghiyev to enter the Saint Petersburg Institute of Railway Transportation. He graduated from the institute with honours in 1904. He then was sent to work in the pioneering of the Saint Petersburg – Vologda railway. In 1905 Malik-Aslanov was assigned a position in the Transcaucasian Railway Department in Tiflis, of which he soon became the chairman. He earned a Ph.D. degree after publishing more than 10 works on railway communications.

Career in the Democratic Republic of Azerbaijan
After the February Revolution of 1917, the Russian Provisional Government appointed Malik-Aslanov Commissioner for the Communications of Transcaucasia. In April 1918 he became Minister of Railway Communications of the newly established and short-lived Transcaucasian Democratic Federative Republic seated in Tiflis. After the dissolution of the federation in May 1918 Malik-Aslanov held the same post in the Azerbaijan Democratic Republic in four of the five cabinets. He was one of the members of the Azerbaijani National Council who signed the Declaration of Independence of 28 May 1918 proclaiming Azerbaijan's sovereignty, and became one of Members of Parliament of the newly founded state. In 1919 Malik-Aslanov was also selected to be member of the State Committee of Defense and the special committee for Romanization of the Azeri alphabet. He initiated the establishment of a bilingual Azeri-Russian institution of higher education to train specialists in the field of railway communications (later reorganized into the Baku College of Railway Transportation). He did not join any party throughout his pre-Soviet political career.

Career in Soviet Azerbaijan
From 1921 to 1930 Khudadat bey Malik-Aslanov served as Dean of the Faculty of Building Engineering at the Azerbaijan Polytechnic Institute. He was also Head of the Department of Railway Communications of Azerbaijan's Supreme Soviet of the National Economy. Malik-Aslanov assisted in the building of a railway from Baku to Julfa and in the introduction of the first elektrichka in the Soviet Union, which took place in Azerbaijan. In 1929, he proposed establishing metro system in Baku (the project was fulfilled in 1967).

Family
In 1906 Khudadat bey Malik-Aslanov married Maria Alexandrova, the daughter of his landlord in Saint Petersburg. They did not have children of their own and adopted the sons of Malik-Aslanov's sister Khurshid.

Arrest and death
Similar to many of those involved in the political affairs of the Azerbaijan Democratic Republic in 1918–1920, Malik-Aslanov was subject to Stalinist persecutions. He was arrested for the first time in 1930 but was released upon Mir Jafar Baghirov's request in 1933. In August 1934 Malik-Aslanov was arrested again on the grounds of not having served his 5-year sentence. In 1935 he died in the Bailov prison. According to the official version, Malik-Aslanov died of natural causes. His family believed he was done away with by someone named Gerasimov. Malik-Aslanov's body was never shown to his family and was buried in a mass grave in the Chemberekend Cemetery. He was officially exonerated in 1959.

References

Azerbaijan Democratic Republic politicians
Azerbaijani engineers
Azerbaijani professors
Academic staff of Azerbaijan Technical University
Azerbaijani nobility
1879 births
1935 deaths
Politicians from Shusha
People from Elizavetpol Governorate
Members of the National Assembly of the Azerbaijan Democratic Republic
Engineers from the Russian Empire